Amra Silajdžić-Džeko (born 1 October 1984) is a Bosnian model and actress.

Career
In 2000, aged 16, Silajdžić won the French contest, Metropolitan Top Model. She was noticed by fashion scouts and became a member of the modeling agency Elite Model in Paris. Silajdžić was featured in commercials for the clothing company Anchor Blue and was the face of Robin Jeans. Since 2010, she has had bit parts in several American television series and a couples films.

She has appeared in music-videos by recording artists such as Enrique Iglesias, Chromeo, The Cataracs, Taio Cruz and Blake Shelton.

Silajdžić had her first starring role in the American film Gothic Assassins, which premiered in October 2011 at the Lucerne Int'l Film Festival in Switzerland.

Amra is the face-model of Jill Valentine in Resident Evil Revelations, Resident Evil The Mercenaries 3D, and Resident Evil Operation Raccoon City.

Personal life
Silajdžić married a Serbian businessman Vladimir Vićentijević in 2001. Their daughter Sofia was born on 1 November 2003. Amra and Vladimir later divorced in 2007.

She has been in a relationship with Bosnian soccer-player Edin Džeko since 2011. The couple married in January 2016 in Rome.

On 2 February 2016, Džeko and Silajdžić became parents of a girl named Una. On 9 September 2017, their second child, a boy named Dani, was born in Rome. She delivered their third child, daughter Dalia, on 12 September 2020.

Filmography

References

External links

1984 births
Living people
Actresses from Sarajevo
21st-century Bosnia and Herzegovina actresses
Bosnia and Herzegovina female models
Bosniaks of Bosnia and Herzegovina
Bosnia and Herzegovina emigrants to the United States
American people of Bosniak descent
Bosnia and Herzegovina film actresses
Association footballers' wives and girlfriends